Paul Warne (born 8 May 1973) is an English professional football manager and former player who played as a midfielder. He is the current Head Coach of EFL League One club Derby County.

Playing career
Warne was born in Norwich, Norfolk and is a supporter of Norwich City. He started playing non-League football for Great Yarmouth Town, before moving onto  Diss Town, with whom he won the FA Vase in 1994. After playing for Wroxham, he started his professional career at the age of 23 when he signed for Wigan Athletic, before moving to Rotherham where he played over 250 games in all competitions, then he moved to Oldham where he became a firm fans favourite in his time there, helping the club to the League One playoffs in the 2006/2007 season, eventually moving on free transfer to Yeovil, where he struggled to get amongst the goals regularly.

During the summer of 2009, after failing to agree a new deal with Yeovil, he joined his former club 
Rotherham United on trial and impressed pre-season. He subsequently signed a one-year contract with the Millers, scoring on his debut on the opening day against Accrington Stanley. On 11 August 2009, he scored the equalising goal as Rotherham surprisingly beat Championship side Derby County 2–1 in the first round of the League Cup. It was made all the more of an upset by the fact that Derby had reached the semifinals of the competition the previous season. He signed a one-year contract extension in June 2010.

Coaching career
He joined the coaching staff at Rotherham in May 2012 upon his retirement from professional football.
During his time playing for Diss Town, Warne coached children at Diss Town FC through his former coaching business, Pass Soccer.

Rotherham United

In November 2012, Warne was granted a testimonial by Rotherham United for giving the club many years of service including as player, coach and joint caretaker-manager.

On 28 November 2016, after the resignation of Kenny Jackett, Warne was appointed caretaker manager of Rotherham United. On 13 January 2017, Warne was appointed Rotherham United manager until the end of the 2016–17 season. On 5 April 2017, with Rotherham's relegation from the Championship confirmed Warne was appointed permanent manager of the club on a one-year rolling contract.

Derby County

After interim manager Liam Rosenior was relieved of his duties, EFL League One side Derby County Football Club, recently saved by local businessman David Clowes, approached Rotherham United to request permission to speak to Warne. Paul Warne was officially announced by Derby County as their new head coach on a four-year-deal after The Rams agreed a compensation package with Rotherham for Warne, alongside Assistant Head Coach Richie Barker, First Team Coach Matt Hamshaw, and First Team Goalkeeper Coach Andy Warrington. Following a stellar January that saw Derby have a 100% record, rising to within touching distance of breaking into the automatic promotion picture, Warne was awarded the League One Manager of the Month award for the third time, his first time with Derby County.

Career statistics

Managerial statistics

Honours

As a player
Diss Town
FA Vase: 1993–94

As a manager
Rotherham United
League One runner-up: 2019–20, 2021–22
League One play-offs: 2017–18
EFL Trophy: 2021–22

Individual
League One Manager of the Month: December 2017, February 2022, January 2023

References

External links

1973 births
Living people
Footballers from Norwich
English footballers
Association football midfielders
Great Yarmouth Town F.C. players
Diss Town F.C. players
Wroxham F.C. players
Wigan Athletic F.C. players
Kettering Town F.C. players
Rotherham United F.C. players
Mansfield Town F.C. players
Oldham Athletic A.F.C. players
Yeovil Town F.C. players
English Football League players
English football managers
Rotherham United F.C. managers
English Football League managers
Rotherham United F.C. non-playing staff